Alok Shrivastava (born 5 March 1964 in Gwalior (MP) is an Indian media producer.

Early life 
He studied at Carmel Convent School (Gwalior) and Central School (Gwalior). He earned a B.com from Mumbai University from Sydenham college.

Career 
His first TV serial was Fassana, which was broadcast on D.D.Metro and continued for 200 episodes. His second serial was Aurat Teri Yahi Kahaani, which completed 350 episodes. Zamane ko Dikhana hai and Durga successfully completed 400 and 200 episodes, respectively. He has done several commercials.

His Hindi feature films as producer included Phool aur Aag, Guru Mahaaguru, Jane Hoga Kya and Farq. He wrote and directed The Unsound, a Hindi film. His banner, PK Arts Creations, produced Wo Kaun Thi. His Marathi feature film Miss Match, under the banner of Gold Coin Entertainment, was released on 12 December 2014.

References

Film directors from Madhya Pradesh
1964 births
Living people
Place of birth missing (living people)